"1/2 Lovesong" is a song by German rock band Die Ärzte. It's the sixth track and the third single from their 1998 album 13. The song was composed by Bela B.

The song is about missing a loved one during a hard time in a relationship. The music video is black-and-white and shows the band singing the song in a room.

Personnel
Rodrigo González – vocals, bass
Farin Urlaub – guitar
Bela B. – drums

Track listing 

 "1/2 Lovesong" – 3:52
 "Ein Lied über Zensur" – 3:20
 "Schlimm" (Felsenheimer) – 3:34
 "Danke für jeden guten Morgen" – 2:43
 "1/2 Lovesong-Video" – 3:52

B-sides 

 "Ein Lied über Zensur" (A song about censorship) was initially much shorter, released on the compilation Zensur?!.
 "Schlimm" (Bad) is about suicide attempts, when one's beloved is not sure about love.

Charts

References

1998 singles
Die Ärzte songs
Songs written by Bela B.